KKQQ (102.3 FM, "K Country 102.3") is a country music station in the Brookings, South Dakota area. The station's transmitter is located in the nearby town of Volga, but the studios are in Brookings. K Country 102.3 broadcasts across a range of eastern South Dakota encompassing the cities of Clear Lake, Dell Rapids, DeSmet, Hendricks, Minnesota, and the region between. The station was formerly in a historic train depot. In 2005, the depot was sold and KKQQ relocated to the building now housing the other four commercial radio stations in Brookings.

Format
K Country 102.3 plays country music from 2000 to today. The station is also the "Home" of Brooking's Bobcat athletics.

External links
K-Country 102.3

KQQ
Brookings County, South Dakota